William Farel (1489 – 13 September 1565), Guilhem Farel or Guillaume Farel, was a French evangelist, Protestant reformer and a founder of the Calvinist Church in the Principality of Neuchâtel, in the Republic of Geneva, and in Switzerland in the Canton of Bern and the (then occupied by Bern) Canton of Vaud.  He is most often remembered for having persuaded John Calvin to remain in Geneva in 1536, and for persuading him to return there in 1541, after their expulsion in 1538.  They influenced the government of Geneva to the point that it became the "Protestant Rome", where Protestants took refuge and non-Protestants were driven out. Together with Calvin, Farel worked to train missionary preachers who spread the Protestant cause to other countries, and especially to France.

Life 

Farel was born in 1489 in Gap.  He was a pupil of the pro-reform Catholic priesthood, at the University of Paris, in the earliest years of the Reformation. There he met the scholar Jacques Lefevre d'Etaples who helped Farel obtain a professorship to teach grammar and philosophy at the Collège Cardinal Lemoine in Paris. With Lefevre he became a member of the Cercle de Meaux gathered together from 1519 by the reform-minded bishop of Meaux, Guillaume Briçonnet. Farel soon became regent of the college. By 1522 he was appointed a diocesan preacher by the bishop.  Farel now could invite a number of Evangelical humanists to work in his diocese to help implement his reform program within the Catholic Church.

This group of humanists also included Josse van Clichtove, Martial Mazurier, Gérard Roussel, and François Vatable. The members of the Meaux circle were of different talents but they generally emphasized the study of the Bible and a return to the theology of the early Church. While working with Lefevre in Meaux, Farel came under the influence of Lutheran ideas and became an avid promoter of them.  After condemnation by the Sorbonne, Farel evangelized fervently in the Dauphiné. Although Farel would become a friend and ally of John Calvin, he had been a promoter of Lutheran ideas in his youth.

Farel was forced to flee to Switzerland because of controversy that was aroused by his writings against the use of images in Christian worship. In 1524, while in Basel, he wrote thirteen theses sharply criticizing Roman doctrine, but his argument was so heated that even Erasmus joined in the demand for his expulsion. He went on to Strasbourg and later Montbéliard, but was again forced to leave. Eventually he spent time at Zurich with Huldrych Zwingli and back at Strasbourg, with Martin Bucer. Finally given license to preach anywhere in the Canton of Bern, he convinced Neuchâtel to join the Reform in 1530.

Farel established himself in Geneva in 1532, where he remained as minister, drawing Calvin to the city, but breaking with him over the Eucharist. Resistance from the established authority led to a brief period of banishment but the Bern government again granted him liberty of worship and he was able to return to preaching. However, the struggle was not over and Farel, along with Calvin, was banished from Geneva in 1538, in part for his rigorous positions, and retired to Neuchâtel. There he spent the rest of his life, and was frequently consulted by Calvin.

In 1558, when he was sixty-nine, Farel married Marie Thorel, who was a teenager. Scott Manetsch notes that Calvin was "flabbergasted and irate" at the marriage, "fearing that his friend's scandalous action would inflict irreparable damage on the cause of the Reformation throughout Europe." The couple did have a son six years later, although he died in infancy. In his final year, after Calvin's death, Farel visited Metz and preached with all his old fire, but the effort seemed to have exhausted him and he died while still in Metz. A monument to him was unveiled at Neuchâtel on 4 May 1876.

References

Sources

Archive Sources 
Autograph, manuscript letters of William Farel sent to other reformers and received by him, are preserved in the "Archives de l'État de Neuchâtel".

External links

1489 births
1565 deaths
People from Gap, Hautes-Alpes
Theologians from the Republic of Geneva
French evangelicals
Swiss Protestant Reformers
Swiss evangelicals
16th-century Swiss people